Lower Barrington is a locality and small rural community in the local government area of Kentish in the North West region of Tasmania.
The 2016 census determined a population of 238 for the state suburb of Lower Barrington.

History
The name “Barrington” was originally applied to a parish in or before 1855 (see here for reference). Lower Barrington was gazetted as a locality in 1965.

Geography
The Forth River, forms the south-western boundary, while the Don River forms the eastern boundary.

Road infrastructure
The B14 route (Sheffield Road) enters the locality from the north-east and exits to the south. The C144 route (Lower Barrington Road) starts at an intersection with route B14 and runs north-west before turning west as Lake Paloona Road and exiting to the west. Lower Barrington Road continues north-west as Route C145 before exiting to the north. The C147 route (Melrose Road) starts at an intersection with route B14 and exits to the north.

References

Localities of Kentish Council
Towns in Tasmania